David William McLetchie CBE (6 August 1952 – 12 August 2013) was a Scottish politician who served as Leader of the Scottish Conservative Party from 1999 to 2005. He was Member of the Scottish Parliament (MSP) for the Edinburgh Pentlands constituency from 2003 to 2011 and the Lothian region from 1999 to 2003 and 2011 to 2013.

Early life and career

Born in Edinburgh, McLetchie attended Leith Academy and George Heriot's School and graduated from the University of Edinburgh with a degree in Law in 1974. He trained as a solicitor with Shepherd and Wedderburn, before joining Tods Murray where he was assumed a partner. He specialised in tax, trusts, and estate planning. In 1979, he contested the Edinburgh Central seat for the Conservatives, but lost to Robin Cook of the Labour Party.

Member of the Scottish Parliament

Leader of the Scottish Conservative Party
McLetchie became Leader of the Scottish Conservative Party upon the creation of the Scottish Parliament in 1999, having been elected in the 1998 Scottish Conservative Party leadership election.  He was forced to resign as Scottish Conservative leader following a scandal over his expense claims in 2005.

Resignation
McLetchie announced his resignation as Scottish Conservative Party leader on 31 October 2005, after it was revealed he had spent £11,500 of taxpayers' money on taxi fares, more than any other MSP. The problem was not so much the large bill, but that he had used taxis for Conservative party business (as opposed to constituency business). His successor as leader was Annabel Goldie.

Backbencher
McLetchie was elected as an additional member for the Lothians region in 1999 and the Edinburgh Pentlands constituency in 2003. Following his resignation as leader, he had a short spell as a backbencher in the Parliament though he remained a prominent figure, his major successes from this period include his campaigns on free personal care and road pricing.

McLetchie was re-elected in Edinburgh Pentlands in 2007 with an increased share of the vote and his majority doubled. On his return, he was made Conservative Chief Whip and business manager, a role which was set to be more important than ever before; given the minority SNP administration. However, he lost his seat to Gordon MacDonald of the SNP in 2011. Although not re-elected in Pentlands, he was returned to Parliament as a "list" MSP for the Lothian region.

Personal life 
McLetchie was appointed a Commander of the Order of the British Empire (CBE) in the 2013 Birthday Honours. He died of cancer on 12 August 2013, aged 61.

Notes

References

External links 
 
 Biography from the Scottish Conservative website

1952 births
2013 deaths
Members of the Scottish Parliament for Edinburgh constituencies
People educated at Leith Academy
People educated at George Heriot's School
Leaders of the Scottish Conservative Party
Commanders of the Order of the British Empire
Conservative MSPs
Scottish solicitors
Alumni of the University of Edinburgh School of Law
Members of the Scottish Parliament 1999–2003
Members of the Scottish Parliament 2003–2007
Members of the Scottish Parliament 2007–2011
Members of the Scottish Parliament 2011–2016
Deaths from cancer in Scotland
Scottish Conservative Party parliamentary candidates
Scottish Freemasons